Coney Hill Hospital (also known as Second Gloucestershire County Asylum) was a mental health facility in Gloucester, England.

History
The hospital site formed part of the Barnwood Mill Estate. It was designed by John Giles & Gough and opened as the Second Gloucestershire County Asylum in 1883. It was the first asylum to be built in true echelon plan. Outer sections to the echelon were planned but never implemented. After the First World War it became the Gloucestershire County Mental Hospital and it joined the National Health Service as Coney Hill Hospital in 1948.

After the introduction of Care in the Community in the early 1980s, the hospital went into a period of decline and closed on 31 December 1994. In 1999, the hospital was largely destroyed by fire. The buildings, with the exception of the administration block, were demolished and the hospital site now forms part of the Abbeymead residential area. The administration block was converted into apartments in 2007.

References

Defunct hospitals in England
Hospitals in Gloucestershire
Hospital buildings completed in 1883
Hospitals established in 1883
1883 establishments in England
Former psychiatric hospitals in England